Laurent Casimir (May 8, 1928 – 1990) was a Haitian artist.

Casimir moved to Port-au-Prince in the late 1940s and is here presented to the Centre d'Art in 1947 by his friend, the painter Dieudonné Cedor. From 1950 to 1956 he attended the Foyer of Fine Arts, founded by a group of intellectuals and modern artists, including Cedor.
Casimir was one of the originators of a Haitian archetype market painting, he painted using various shades of red, orange and yellow. His style has been often imitated, it is difficult to confirm the authenticity of the paintings that bear his name.

In the mid-1970s he lived in Martissant where he would be selling his paintings from the front room, while in the back yard, a few of his apprentices would be painting and filling in the colours and the Casimir's canvases, all would later be signed by him.

Bibliography 
 The Naive Tradition: Haiti, Milwaukee Art Center, 1974.
 Ute Stebick, Haitian Art, The Brooklyn Museum, 1978.

References

1928 births
1990 deaths
20th-century Haitian painters
20th-century male artists
Haitian male painters